Desmoceratoidea, formerly Desmocerataceae, is a superfamily of Cretaceous ammonites, generally with round or oval-whorled shells that are mostly smooth or weakly ribbed and rarely tuberculate, but commonly with constrictions. Regarded as monophyletic, the Desmocerataceae are derived from the Phylloceratidae, splitting off in the Early Cretaceous (Valanginian) and persisting to the end of the Maastrichtian.

References

 
Ammonitina
Ammonitida superfamilies
Valanginian first appearances
Maastrichtian extinctions